MediBang Paint is a free raster graphics editor designed primarily for digital art and 2D animation. It is developed by MediBang, a Japanese company. The app is a cross-platform software that can be used on Windows, macOS, iOS, Android. There are brushes, tools available, and the software also supports layer-based editing.

Interface 
Tools are grouped into different categories. Canvas is located in the center of the window. The layers panel is located on the right side of the window. The layers panel allows you to manage layers of your painting. The color palette is located on the left side MediBang Paint for free download of the window.

Extension 
MDP is the native format used to save images in MediBang Paint.

References

See also 

 Krita
 Comparison of raster graphics editors

2014 software
Windows software
Android (operating system) software
Cross-platform free software
Free 2D animation software
Free raster graphics editors
Graphics software